Cristhian is a Spanish given name. Notable people with the name include:

Cristhian Adames (born 1991), Dominican baseballer
Cristhian Britos (born 1990), Uruguayan footballer
Cristhian Hernández (born 1993), Mexican footballer
Cristhian Lagos (born 1984), Costa Rican footballer
Cristhian Maciel (born 1992), Uruguayan footballer
Cristhian Martínez (born 1982), former Dominican baseballer 
Cristhian Pacheco (born 1993), Peruvian long distance runner
Cristhian Paredes (born 1998), Paraguayan footballer
Cristhian Presichi (born 1980), Mexican baseballer
Cristhian Stuani (born 1986), Uruguayan footballer
Cristhian Subero (born 1991), Colombian footballer
Cristhian Venegas (born 1993), Chilean footballer

Spanish masculine given names